Jeri Hanel Watts is an American author and professor, known for her book Kizzy Ann Stamps and A Piece of Home, which won the 2017 Ezra Jack Keats New Writer Award. She currently lives in Virginia, where she is an associate professor at Lynchburg College.

Bibliography 
 Keepers (1997, Lee & Low Books)
 Kizzy Ann Stamps (2012, Candlewick Press)
 A Piece of Home (2016, Candlewick Press)

References 

Year of birth missing (living people)
Living people
Writers from Virginia
University of Lynchburg faculty